The Global Food Security Act of 2016, is a law introduced on March 24, 2015, in the 114th Congress by Representative Christopher Henry "Chris" Smith (New Jersey-R) and on May 7, 2015, by Senator Robert Patrick "Bob" Casey Jr. (Pennsylvania-D), and signed by President Barack Obama on July 20, 2016. 

The law authorizes a comprehensive, strategic approach for United States foreign assistance to developing countries to reduce global poverty and hunger, achieve food security and improved nutrition, promote inclusive, sustainable agricultural-led economic growth, improve nutritional outcomes, especially for women and children, build resilience among vulnerable populations, and for other purposes.

This law has been endorsed by a number of humanitarian organizations, including Oxfam, Food for the Hungry, Bread for the World, The Borgen Project  and the ONE Campaign.

See also 
 Poverty
 International Aid
 International Development
 Millennium Development Goals
 Sustainable Development Goals
 Feed the Future Initiative

References

External links
 Global Food Security Act Summary

Acts of the 114th United States Congress
Food security in the United States
United States foreign aid